This is demographic history of Syrmia.

Prehistory

Between 3000 BC and 2400 BC, Syrmia was a core area of Indo-European Vučedol culture.

6th-7th century

In 6th-7th century, entire Syrmia region was populated by Slavs. According to other source, it was also populated by Gepids, and Avars.

11th-12th century

In 11th-12th century, according to Hungarian sources, region of Syrmia had partially Slavic and partially mixed Slavic-Hungarian population. Around 1154, Al-Idrisi, a Muslim geographer, described Manđelos as a rich town, whose inhabitants pursued a rather "nomadic way of life". By some opinions, Idrisi might have referred simply to stock-breeding that played an important role among the Hungarian inhabitants of the entire region of Syrmia This fact was confirmed later by several Byzantine authors in the 12th century (Ioannes Kinnamos, Niketas Choniates, Patriarch Michael).

1437

In 1437, the largest part of Syrmia was populated by Serbs according to Serbian scholars. According to other sources Hungarians and Serbs lived mixed in this area in 1437.

1495

In 1495, the area of Syrmia had a mixed population of Croats, Hungarians and Serbs.

1857

According to the census from 1857, 59.4% of population of the part of Syrmia under civil administration and 63.2% of population of the part of Syrmia under military administration (Petrovaradin regiment) were ethnic Serbs. The second largest ethnic group were Croats, while other ethnic groups were Germans, Hungarians, etc.

1910

According to the census from 1910, the population of the Syrmia region (Syrmia county) numbered 414,234 inhabitants, including:
 Serbian language = 183,109 (44.20%) 
 Croatian language = 106,198 (25.64%) 
 German language = 68,086 (16.44%) 
 Hungarian language = 29,522 (7.13%) 
 Slovak language = 13,841 (3.34%) 
 Rusyn language = 4,642 (1.12%)

1931

In 1931, the population of Syrmia included:
 Serbs = 210,000 
 Croats = 117,000 
 Germans = 68,300 
 Hungarians = 21,300 
 Slovaks = 15,300 
 Ukrainians = 5,300

1971

In 1971, the population of the Serbian part of Syrmia (excluding City of Belgrade's municipalities of Novi Beograd and Zemun which are geographically part of Syrmia) numbered 313,926 inhabitants, including:
Serbs = 228,609 (72.84%)
Croats = 38,389 (12.23%)
Slovaks = 14,056 (4.48%)
Hungarians = 9,376 (2.99%)
Yugoslavs = 9,086 (2.89%)
Rusyns = 3,403 (1.08%)
Ukrainians = 1,512 (0.48%)
Montenegrins = 1,400 (0.44%)
Slovenes = 1,065 (0.34%)
Macedonians = 1,023 (0.33%)

2011
According to the 2011 census in Serbia, the population of the Serbian part of Syrmia (excluding City of Belgrade's municipalities of Novi Beograd, Zemun and Surčin which are geographically part of Syrmia) numbered 370,114 people and is composed of:
 Serbs = 310,376 (83.74%)
 Croats = 11,445 (3.08%)
 Slovaks =  9,216 (2.48%)
 Romani people = 6,984 (1.88%)
 Hungarians = 4,901 (1.32%)

According to the 2011 census in Croatia, the population of the Croatian Vukovar-Srijem county, numbering 179,521, is composed of:
 Croats = 142,135 (79.17%)
 Serbs = 27,824 (15.5%)
 Hungarians = 1,696 (0.94%)
 Rusyns = 1,427 (0.79%)
 Slovaks = 1,185 (0.66%)

References

History of Syrmia
Demographic history of Vojvodina
Syrmia